A lineal descendant, in legal usage, is a blood relative in the direct line of descent – the children, grandchildren, great-grandchildren, etc. of a person. In a legal procedure sense, lineal descent refers to the acquisition of estate by inheritance by parent from grandparent and by child from parent, whereas collateral descent refers to the acquisition of estate or real property by inheritance by sibling from sibling, and cousin from cousin.

Adopted children, for whom adoption statutes create the same rights of heirship as children of the body, come within the meaning of the term "lineal descendants," as used in a statute providing for the non-lapse of a devise where the devisee predeceases the testator but leaves lineal descendants.

Among some Native American tribes in the United States, tribal enrollment can be determined by lineal descent, as opposed to a minimum blood quantum. Lineal descent means that anyone directly descended from original tribal enrollees could be eligible for tribal enrollment, regardless of how much native blood they have.

The antonym of descendant is antecedent.

Collateral descendant
A collateral descendant is a legal term for a relative descended from a sibling of an ancestor, and thus a niece, nephew, or cousin.

References

Kinship and descent
Legal terminology
Property law